League of Neutrality may refer to:
First League of Armed Neutrality
Second League of Armed Neutrality